Moon Hee-kyung (born December 22, 1965) is a South Korean actress. Moon made her acting debut in musical theatre in 1995. She has also played supporting roles in films and television series, notably Skeletons in the Closet (also known as Shim's Family) in 2007.

In 2016, Moon became the only person to compete in both seasons of Tribe of Hip Hop.

Philanthropy 
In February 2023, Moon donated 1 million won to Hometown Love Donation.

Filmography

Film

Television series

Web series

Television shows

Discography

Singles

Musical theatre

Ambassadorship 
 Public relations ambassador of Boryeong-si, Chungcheongnam-do (2022)
 Public Relations Ambassador 2022 Boryeong Marine Mud Expo (2022)

Awards and nominations

References

External links 
 Moon Hee-kyung Fan Cafe at Daum 
 
 
 
 

1965 births
Living people
South Korean television actresses
South Korean film actresses
South Korean musical theatre actresses
South Korean web series actresses
Sookmyung Women's University alumni
Dankook University alumni
People from Jeju Province